Chaetostoma changae is a species of catfish in the family Loricariidae. It is native to South America, where it is known only from Peru. The species reaches 7.6 cm (3 inches) SL and its specific epithet honors Fonchii Chang, a Peruvian ichthyologist of the National University of San Marcos.

References 

changae
Fish described in 2006
Catfish of South America
Fish of Peru